Glenn Dickson (born 22 October 1986 in Dunedin, New Zealand) is a rugby union player who signed for Northampton Saints in the Aviva Premiership He now resides in the seaside town of Weston-super-Mare, coaches the local team and is involved in rugby development for the region.

Club career
Noted for his former career as a child actor, Dickson moved through age group levels for Otago and made the provincial side for the 2009 Air New Zealand Cup, where he made 6 starts and led the team with 72 points.

In the 2010 ITM Cup, Dickson appeared in all 13 Otago contests, starting in 12 of them, and again led the side with 99 points.

In the 2012 ITM Cup, he captained Otago to the final, which they lost to Counties at ECO Light Stadium.

He has signed for Northampton Saints for the 2013 rugby season, ending his long career with Otago.

External links
 Otago Profile

1986 births
Living people
New Zealand rugby union players
Rugby union fly-halves
Rugby union players from Dunedin